Johann "Hannes" Schneider (24 June 1890 – 26 April 1955) was an Austrian ski instructor of the first half of the 20th century, famous for pioneering the Arlberg technique of instruction. Many consider him the Father of Modern Day Skiing. A statue of him in North Conway, New Hampshire, states the very same claim.

Biography
Schneider was born in the town of Stuben am Arlberg in Austria, the son of a farmer who also kept a few cows that provided fresh milk for local cheesemakers. His father was also a road supervisor tasked with keeping the crucial Arlberg Pass open during the winter months. It was his father's hope that Hannes would become a cheesemaker.

Hannes first observed skiing in 1900 when Viktor Sohm visited the town of Stuben. Legend has it that Schneider made his first pair of skis from an old barrel; in reality, he took measurements of Sohm's skis and had a local barrel maker craft him a pair. Sohm took Schneider under his wing during his winter visits to the Arlberg region. Schneider became more proficient on his skis and soon gained a reputation for his skills, winning many local races.

In 1907, he was offered a spot as an apprentice cheesemaker, much to the delight of his parents. However, an offer to teach skiing at a hotel in Les Avants, Switzerland opened his family's eyes to the possibility that one could make a living skiing. At the time the hotel had a vibrant summer business but few visitors in the winter.

Word of the offer spread throughout the towns of the region and he was offered a similar arrangement at the Hotel Post in St Anton am Arlberg. Karl Schuler, owner of the Hotel Post, knew this was an opportunity to position St Anton as a major ski resort for the growing sport.

While at St Anton, Schneider developed the basics of ski instruction known as the "Hannes Schneider Arlberg Ski Technique and Method of Teaching", or simply the Arlberg technique. This technique is still used today as a foundation for teaching alpine skiing. Many of the early pioneers of alpine skiing passed through Schneider's school as instructors, including Luiggi Foger, Rudi Matt, Benno Rybizka, and Otto Lang, who went on to open Hannes Schneider  ski schools in the United States at Mount Rainier, Mount Hood, and Mount Baker and ran the Sun Valley Ski School for many years.

Schneider was drafted into the Austrian Army in 1908, but was reassigned to the Reserves after a few months when the town fathers of St Anton claimed that his ski school had become crucial in the Arlberg region. Schneider did serve as a ski instructor for the Austrian Army during the First World War, after which he returned to the Hotel Post. In 1920, he appeared in a documentary film based on the Arlberg technique, and formed a semi-independent ski school where by 1924 he had formalized his method of instruction. In 1928, he helped organize the international Arlberg-Kandahar alpine race at St. Anton.

In the interwar period he also appeared in several more of Dr. Arnold Fanck's ski films. The White Ecstasy, which helped make skiing widely popular, was filmed at the Arlberg in the winter of 1930–1931. Schneider also co-wrote a best-selling instructional book with Fanck, named Die Wunder des Schneeschuhs, which was translated into English as The Wonders of Skiing in 1931. Former students of Hannes Schneider include Otto Lang, Friedl Pfeifer, and Toni Matt.

In 1938, after Germany and the Third Reich took control of Austria in the Anschluss, Hannes Schneider, an outspoken critic of the Nazis, was stripped of his ski school and imprisoned. In 1939, the President of Manufacturers Trust Company, American Harvey Gibson, negotiated the exoneration of Schneider and brought him to the USA to re-opening his ski school at his Cranmore Mountain in North Conway, New Hampshire. Schneider, recognized as the father of skiing, ran the ski school and the resort until his death in 1955. . During the Second World War, he helped train the 10th Mountain Division of the U.S. Army, in which his son Herbert served.

Hannes Schneider died in New Hampshire in 1955, at the age of 64.

Legacy
Hannes was posthumously inducted into the U.S. Ski Hall of Fame in 1958. The New England Ski Museum hosts the Hannes Schneider Meister Skiing Cup in his memory every March at Cranmore Mountain Resort. In 2005, the New England Ski Museum featured an exhibit on the life of Hannes Schneider and his impact on the sport of skiing.

Selected filmography
  (1920)
  (1921)
 Mountain of Destiny (1924)
 The Holy Mountain (1926)
 Hannes Schneider (1926) short film
 Struggle for the Matterhorn (1928)
 The White Ecstasy (1931)
 The Scoundrel (1939)

References

 Fanck, Arnold; Schneider, Hannes (1925) Wunder des Schneeschuhs; ein System des richtigen Skilaufens und seine Anwendung im alpinen Geländelauf Hamburg: Gebrüder Enoch OCLC 10252521
 Pfeifer, Emil Armin (1934) Hannes Schneider's hohe Schule des Skilaufs Alpensportverl.
 Schneider, Hannes (1935) Auf Schi in Japan Tyrolia-Verlag
 Rybizka, Benno (1938) The Hannes Schneider Ski Technique Harcourt, Brace
 Schneider, Hannes (ed.) (1940) The Northland Ski Manual Northland Ski Manufacturing Company
 Frank, Virginia Katherine (1957) Hannes Schneider: His Life and His Contributions to Skiing Smith College, Northampton, Mass. OCLC 34990536
 Fairlie, Gerard (1957) Flight Without Wings. The Biography of Hannes Schneider London: Hodder and Stoughton
 "Schneider's Films" Skiing Magazine (Feb. 1961) p. 64
 Cohen, Stan (1985) A Pictorial History of Downhill Skiing Pictorial Histories Pub. Co  pp 24–25
 Thöni, Hans (1990) Hannes Schneider: zum 100. Geburtstag des Skipioniers und Begründers der Arlberg-Technik Tyrolia-Verlag 
 Lund, Morten (Spring 1993) "Films of Hannes Schneider" Skiing Heritage Vol 5 #1:8-11
 Legacy: Austria's influence on American skiing. Part 1: Hannes Schneider & his disciples (2005) retrospective film by Ian Scully, Rick Moulton; Culture Films OCLC 76765013
 Killy and Vierhaus (eds) (2005) Dictionary of German Biography Walter de Gruyter  pg 56
 Thöni, Hans (2007) Schneider, Hannes in: Neue Deutsche Biographie (NDB). Band 23, Berlin: Duncker & Humblot 
Lang, Otto (1994): A Bird of Passage. SkyHouse Publishers,

External links
A biography of Hannes Schneider
Mount Cranmore where the Meister Skiing race is held
Skischule Arlberg, founded by Hannes Schneider in 1921
Hannes Schneider, father of modern skiing
Timeline entries for years 1910, 1918, 1920, 1921, 1925, 1928, 1939 in Skiing Heritage
Multiple articles on aspects of Schneider's life in Skiing Heritage magazine
 
A Bird of Passage, by Otto Lang.  Excellent Chapter of Annes Schneider 

Austrian male alpine skiers
1890 births
1955 deaths
Austro-Hungarian military personnel of World War I